Gaupne is the administrative center of the municipality of Luster in Vestland county, Norway. The village of Veitastrond is located across the mountains  to the northwest. The Sognefjellsvegen road passes through here on its way to the village of Skjolden and beyond.

Gaupne sits at the southern end of the Jostedalen valley, with the river Jostedøla's mouth located in Gaupne. It sits southwest of the Jostedalsbreen glacier, between Jostedalsbreen National Park and Breheimen National Park.

There are two churches in Gaupne, the historic Old Gaupne Church and the newer Gaupne Church.

Economy
The village is home to several industries including tourism, printing, cement manufacturing, and apparel manufacturing. The nearby Leirdøla power plant is located just north of the village. Also, Statkraft's administration for Central Norway is based here. The village is known as "Etikettbygda"  (Label Village).

Notable residents
Kåre Øvregard, a former member of the Parliament of Norway (Storting)

References

Villages in Vestland
Luster, Norway